The following ships of the Indian Navy have been named INS Himgiri:

  was a  launched in 1970 and decommissioned in 2005
  is a  launched in 2020

Indian Navy ship names